SCPS may refer to:

 Savannah Christian Preparatory School
 New York University School of Continuing and Professional Studies
 Seaway Crude Pipeline System
 Seminole County Public Schools
 Society of Civil and Public Servants
 Space Communications Protocol Specifications
 Spotsylvania County Public Schools
Soldier Plate Carrier System
Stafford County Public Schools
Sussex county public schools